The 1986 Arkansas State Indians football team represented Arkansas State University as a member of the Southland Conference during the 1986 NCAA Division I-AA football season. Led by eighth-year head coach Larry Lacewell, the Indians compiled an overall record of 12–2–1 with a mark of 5–0 in conference play, winning the Southland title for the second consecutive season. Arkansas State advanced to the advanced to the NCAA Division I-AA Football Championship playoffs, where they defeated Sam Houston State, Delaware, and  en route to the NCAA Division I-AA Championship Game, where they were defeated by Georgia Southern.

Schedule

References

Arkansas State
Arkansas State Red Wolves football seasons
Southland Conference football champion seasons
Arkansas State Indians football